Lane Cove West is a suburb  on the Lower North Shore of Sydney, in the state of New South Wales, Australia. Lane Cove West is located 9 kilometres north-west of the Sydney central business district, in the local government area of the Municipality of Lane Cove. Lane Cove and Lane Cove North are separate suburbs.

History
The land in the area was originally used for agriculture and owned by John Blackman. From the mid-1950s Lane Cove West was home to the national head office, pressing plant, warehouse and recording studios of the Warner Bros. Records label Festival Mushroom Records. Lane Cove West Public School was also built at this time.

Lane Cove West split off from Lane Cove to become a separate suburb on 6 September 2002.

Population
In the 2016 Census, there were 2,637 people in Lane Cove West. 62.7% of people were born in Australia. The most common countries of birth were England 5.4% and China 3.8%.  74.0% of people only spoke English at home. The most common responses for religion were Catholic 30.6%, No Religion 27.3% and Anglican 15.2%.

Commercial area
Lane Cove West Business Park is an industrial area with factories and warehouses of such companies as Cochlear Hearing Implants, Macquarie Goodman, La Kantina (restaurant), Rockwell Automation, Harley Davidson (head office) and a Storage King complex (on the same site where previously a Nestle factory was located). Most of these are located on Mars Road and Sam Johnson Way (Orion Rd).

There are also a number of small businesses situated at Figtree Plaza on Cullen Street and Burns Bay Road. These include a hair salon, cafe, beautician, fish and chip shop, award winning fruit & vegetable market, and butcher shop. Close by is the Metropolitan Baptist Church.

Heritage listing
 Lane Cove House (c. 1850), at 38 Myee Crescent, is listed on the Register of the National Estate. In the early twentieth century it was a private psychiatric hospital.

Parks and recreation
Blackman Park is situated on the Lane Cove River and was originally a small valley used for landfill. It features a number of recreation facilities including tennis courts at the Lane Cove West Tennis Club, cricket pitches, bike tracks, basketball court, skate park and bush walking tracks. Smaller reserves include Cullen St Reserve, Henley Reserve, Penrose St Park, Garthowen St Cricket Nets and Epping Road Reserve. There is also a lawn bowls club, Lane Cove Bowling Club (formerly called Lane Cove West Bowling Club).

References

External links
 

Suburbs of Sydney